Eric Paul Cockeram (4 July 1924 – 25 December 2021) was a British Conservative Party politician.

Life and career
Cockeram was born on 4 July 1924. 

He served in the British Army in the Second World War, taking part in the D-Day landings during World War II as a Second Lieutenant in the 2nd Battalion of the Gloucestershire Regiment where he was wounded in the face by a grenade on Gold Beach. He was demobilised with the rank of Captain.

He worked in his family's tailoring and outfitters firm, Watson Prickard, becoming company chairman.

Originally elected Member of Parliament for Bebington in 1970, Cockeram lost his seat (which he fought unsuccessfully as the renamed Bebington and Ellesmere Port) in both the 1974 general elections. Elected for Ludlow in 1979, he suddenly announced his retirement weeks before the 1987 general election, following allegations of multiple share applications for British Telecom and British Gas. This followed the Thatcher government's privatisation of both organisations, which allowed members of the public to buy shares in them. One of the share applications was for Cockeram's grandchildren but he denied wrongdoing and the Crown Prosecution Service decided he had no case to answer.

Cockeram died on 25 December 2021, at the age of 97. At time of his death he was married with four children and was one of the few surviving former MPs who saw active service during World War II.

References

The Times Guide to the House of Commons, Times Newspapers Ltd, 1983

External links 
 

1924 births
2021 deaths
Conservative Party (UK) MPs for English constituencies
UK MPs 1970–1974
UK MPs 1979–1983
UK MPs 1983–1987
Members of the Parliament of the United Kingdom for constituencies in Shropshire
British Army personnel of World War II
Gloucestershire Regiment officers